Roby Varghese Raj is an Indian cinematographer who works in Malayalam cinema. He debuted in A. K. Sajan’s Puthiya Niyamam. The film featured Mammootty and Nayantara in lead roles.

Early life
Roby was born in Thrissur, Kerala, India. He graduated from Dr G R Damodaran College of Science. He has one elder brother Rony David who is an actor in malayalam films.

Career
Roby started working as an assistant cinematographer with Rubaiyz Mohammed and Himman Dhammija in 2010 at Mumbai and then moved to Kochi to assist Jomon T. John and Loganathan Srinivasan in 2012. He studied cinematography at Mind Screen Film Institute, Chennai under Rajiv Menon.

Filmography

References

External links
 

Malayalam film cinematographers
Living people
People from Thrissur district
Cinematographers from Kerala
Year of birth missing (living people)